Mohamed Faragalla (born 1 January 1939) is a Sudanese boxer. He competed in the men's welterweight event at the 1960 Summer Olympics.

References

1939 births
Living people
Welterweight boxers
South Sudanese male boxers
Sudanese male boxers
Olympic boxers of Sudan
Boxers at the 1960 Summer Olympics
People from Upper Nile (state)